{{Infobox officeholder
|honorific_prefix = Shaykh al-IslāmD.Litt.
| name = Taqi Usmani
| honorific_suffix = SI
|image = Taqi Usmani in London (2016).jpg
|caption = Usmani in 2016
|title  =
| office              = Justice of the Shariat Appellate Bench of the Supreme Court
| appointer           = Muhammad Zia ul-Haq
| nominator           = 
| predecessor         = 
| successor           =
| term_start          = 1982
| term_end            = 2002
| office1             = Justice of the Federal Shariat Court
| alongside1          = Karam Shah al-Azhari and Malik Ghulam Ali
| appointer1          = Muhammad Zia ul-Haq
| nominator1          = 
| predecessor1        = 
| successor1          =
| term_start1         = 6 July 1981
| term_end1           = 10 July 1982
|birth_date = 
|birth_place = Deoband, United Provinces, British India
|father = Shafi Usmani
|relations = Rafi Usmani Mahmood Ashraf Usmani 
|alma_mater = 
|awards = 
| website = 
| nationality = Pakistani
| signature = Muhammad Taqi Usmani Signature.svg
|module = {{Infobox religious biography
|embed = yes
|denomination = Sunni
|era = 21st-century philosophy
|Madh'hab = Hanafi
|creed = Maturidi
|movement = Deobandi
|main_interests = Quran, Arabic, Shari'a, Hadith, Fiqh, Tafsir, Sufism, Islamic finance, Kalam
|notable_ideas = Evolution of Islamic economics, Islamic banking, Meezan Bank, The Hadith Encyclopedia, The Jurisprudence of Trade, Easy English Translation of the Qur'an and Detailed English Tafseer
| notable_works = Muhammad Taqi Usmani bibliography
| influences  = 
| influenced = Muhammad ibn Adam Al-Kawthari, Muhammad Abdul Malek, Mizanur Rahman Sayed, Abu Taher Misbah
| disciple_of = Mawlana Dr. Muhammad Abdul Hai Arifi, Mawlana Muhammad Masihullah Khan 
| students = 
| literary_works = {{hlist|The Noble Quran: Meaning With Explanatory Notes (2007)|An Introduction to Islamic Finance (1998)|Islam and Modernism (1990)|Takmilat Fath al-Mulhim (1994)|Tauzeeh Al-Qur'an (2009|Usul al-Ifta wa Adabuhu (2010)}}
}}
}}
Muhammad Taqi Usmani (born 5 October 1943) is a Pakistani Islamic scholar and former judge who is the current president of the Wifaq ul Madaris Al-Arabia and the vice president and Hadith professor of the Darul Uloom Karachi. An intellectual leader of the Deobandi movement, he has authored 143 books in Urdu, Arabic and English, including a translation of the Qur'an in both English and Urdu as well a 6-volume commentary on the Sahih Muslim in Arabic, Takmilat Fath al-Mulhim and Uloomu-l-Quran. He has written and lectured extensively on hadith, and Islamic finance. He chairs the Shariah Board of the Bahrain-based Accounting and Auditing Organization for Islamic Financial Institutions (AAOIFI). He is also a permanent member of the Jeddah-based International Islamic Fiqh Academy, an organ of the OIC.

In Pakistan, Usmani served as a scholar judge on the Shariat Appellate Bench of the Supreme Court from 1982 to 2002, and on the Federal Shariat Court from 1981 to 1982. From 1977 to 1981 he was a member of Zia's Council of Islamic Ideology and was involved in drafting the Hudood Ordinances.

Early life and education

Muhammad Taqi Usmani was born on 5 Shawwal 1362 AH (3 October 1943) in the city of Deoband in Saharanpur district, United Provinces, British India. He was the fifth and youngest son of Mufti Muhammad Shafi (1897–1976). With his full nasab (patronymic), he is Muhammad Taqi ibn Muhammad Shafi ibn Muhammad Yasin ibn Khalifah Tahsin Ali ibn Imam Ali ibn Karim Allah ibn Khair Allah ibn Shukr Allah. The forefathers of Miyanji Shukr Allah are unknown, but the family claims descent from Uthman, the third caliph and a companion of the Islamic prophet Muhammad, hence the nisbat "Usmani".

Usmani was born to several generations of educators. The title "Miyanji" applied to several of his ancestors indicates that they were teachers. His grandfather Muhammad Yasin (1865/661936) taught Persian at Darul Uloom Deoband. Born the year before the madrasah's founding, he had been one of its first students and studied with some of its early teachers including Muhammad Yaqub Nanautawi, Sayyid Ahmad Dihlawi, Mulla Mahmud Deobandi, and Mahmud al-Hasan Deobandi. Usmani's father Muhammad Shafi was also a product of the Deoband seminary. He taught there for several decades and held the post of chief mufti.

In 1948, when Usmani was four years old, his father immigrated the family from Deoband to Karachi, Pakistan. Since there was not a madrasah nearby, Usmani's primary education began at home under his parents. He was later enrolled in Darul Uloom Karachi after Mufti Shafi founded the school in 1950. After completing his primary education, he began his formal religious training in the Dars-i Nizami curriculum in 1953. He passed the Fazil-i Arabi (Punjab Board) with distinction in 1958, and received his Alimiyyah degree with distinction from Darul Uloom Karachi in 1959. He then obtained his Takhassus (specialization) degree in fiqh (Islamic jurisprudence) and ifta (fatwa issuance) from Darul Uloom Karachi in 1961, earning the title of "Mufti". Usmani continued his education at the University of Karachi, obtaining a Bachelor of Arts in economics and politics in 1964, then a Bachelor of Laws with second-class honours in 1967. In 1970 he obtained a Master of Arts with first-class honours in Arabic language and literature from the University of Punjab.

 Teachers 
Usmani received teaching licenses to teach hadith from Islamic scholars including Muhammad Shafi, Muhammad Idris Kandhlawi, Qari Muhammad Tayyib, Saleemullah Khan, Rashid Ahmed Ludhianvi, Sahban Mahmud, Zafar Ahmad Usmani, Muhammad Zakariya Kandhalvi, Hasan al-Mahshat Al-Makki Al-Maliki, 'Abdu-l-'Azeez Ibn Baz Al-Maliki, Abd al-Fattah Abu Ghuddah, Abi Al-Faid Muhammad Yasin Al-Fadani Ash-Shafi'i, and others.

 Islamic Economics 
Usmani pioneered the concept of Islamic banking in Pakistan when he established the Meezan Bank. Usmani has authored books in Arabic, Urdu, and English on Islamic topics in addition to articles on Islamic banking and finance published in journals and magazines.

According to The Muslim 500: "Usmani's chief influence comes from his position as a global authority on the issue of Islamic finance."

 Awards and honours 
 2022: The Royal Islamic Strategic Studies Centre ranks Usmani 6th in the 2023 edition of The 500 Most Influential Muslims.
 2022: Honorary doctorate degree awarded in Islamic Law and Jurisprudence by American International Theism University
 2019: Sitara-i Imtiaz (Star of Excellence) in the field of public service, conferred by the President of Pakistan
 2019: The Royal Islamic Strategic Studies Centre ranks Usmani 1st in the 2020 edition of The 500 Most Influential Muslims. He has been included in the top 50 in every edition of the publication since its inception in 2009.
 2017: The Global Islamic Finance Report ranks Usmani 2nd most influential person in the global Islamic financial services industry
 2017: Lifetime Achievement Award, Islamic Finance Excellence Awards (IFEA), Center of Islamic Finance at COMSATS Institute of Information Technology, Lahore
 2016: Lifetime Achievement Award, Islamic Finance Forum of South Asia (IFFSA)
 2014: Islamic Development Bank (IDB) Prize in Islamic Banking and Finance
 2011: King Abdullah II Award
 2011: Lifetime Achievement Award, Islamic Business & Finance Magazine
 2010: Wisam al-Istiqlal (Order of Independence), 1st class, conferred by the King of Jordan
 2004: Emir Muhammad bin Rashid Al Maktum Award

 Academia 
He currently teaches Sahih al-Bukhari, fiqh, and Islamic economics at Darul Uloom Karachi and is known for his Islahi Khutbat. He was a key member of a team of scholars which helped declare Ahmadis non-Muslims by Pakistan's National Assembly during the era of former Pakistani president, Zulfikar Ali Bhutto, in the 1970s. During the presidency of General Zia ul Haq, he was instrumental in drafting laws pertaining to Hudood, Qisas meaning retaliation in kind or (eye for an eye, and Diyya (blood money).

Personal views
Usmani strongly opposes elements of explicit modernity, which he describes as engulfing

"the whole world in the tornado of nudity and obscenity, and has provided an excuse for fornication, and more so it has led under thunder claps to the passage of a bill in the British House of Commons to legalize homosexuality. It is in the shadow of the same modernity that Western women are openly displaying banners on the streets demanding legalization of abortion"

At a religious conference in 1984, he urged a more "dynamic attitude" towards the practice of ijtihad, arguing there is no shortage of fine minds capable of interpreting the sharia, but warning against the contamination of sharia by Western ideas such as the elimination of hudud penalties such as amputation and stoning.

Positions held

 Positions held in the past 

Bibliography

Usmani has authored 143 books including Tauzeeh Al-Qur'an, An Introduction to Islamic Finance, Contemporary Fataawa, The Authority of Sunnah, Uloomu-l-Qur'an. He has also written a supplement to Shabbir Ahmad Usmani's Fath al-Mulhim, entitled Takmilat Fath al-Mulhim''.

See also
 Contemporary Islamic philosophy

References

Bibliography

External links

Studio Recording HD Audio Quran Tafseer Urdu Lectures by Mufti Taqi Usmani
Urdu Books - Mufti Taqi Usmani
English Books - Mufti Taki Usmani
Khutbaat e Usmani (Juma Lectures) of Mufti Taqi Usmani in Urdu
Audio Quran Tafseer Lectures by Mufti Taqi Usmani
Get Urdu Quran Translation (Audio & PDF Version) by Taqi Usmani
Official website of Darul Uloom Karachi
An Introduction to Islamic Finance by Mufti Taqi Usmani

1943 births
Living people
Pakistani Islamic religious leaders
Deobandis
Pakistani Sunni Muslim scholars of Islam
Muhajir people
Pakistani judges
Jurisprudence academics
Sharia judges
University of Karachi alumni
University of the Punjab alumni
Translators of the Quran into English
Translators of the Quran into Urdu
People from Deoband
People from Karachi
Recipients of Sitara-i-Imtiaz
Jamia Darul Uloom, Karachi alumni
Darul Uloom Karachi people
Presidents of Wifaq ul Madaris Al-Arabia
Wifaq ul Madaris Al-Arabia people
Muhammad Taqi Usmani
Islamic economists